The Stadion Górnika Łęczna (Górnik Łęczna Stadium) is a football stadium in Łęczna, Poland.  It is the home stadium of Górnik Łęczna. The stadium has a capacity of 7,200 people. The stadium also has a heated pitch as of 2006.

References 

Łęczna
Górnik Łęczna
Sports venues in Lublin Voivodeship